Alfred Barnard Basset FRS (25 July 1854 – 5 December 1930) was a British mathematician working on algebraic geometry, electrodynamics and hydrodynamics. In fluid dynamics, the Basset force—also known as the Boussinesq–Basset force—describes history effects on the force experienced by a body in unsteady motion (relative to a viscous fluid). He also worked on Bessel functions: the term Basset function was at one time used for modified Bessel functions of the second kind but is now obsolete.

Biography
Basset graduated B.A. from Trinity college, Cambridge in 1877 as 13th wrangler and finished his M.A. in 1881. He started his career in law, but soon abandoned it to continue his mathematical research. He was elected a fellow of the Royal Society in 1889.

Books

References

English mathematicians
1854 births
1930 deaths
Algebraic geometers
Fellows of the Royal Society
Mathematicians from London
Fluid dynamicists